The Jedediah Hawkins House is a historic house located at 400 South Jamesport Avenue in Jamesport, Suffolk County, New York.

Description and history 
It was built in 1864, and is a frame Italianate style residence. It is a two-story, plus attic, structure with a tall tower (campanile) and a random ashlar, granite foundation. Also on the property is the original 19th-century outhouse, milkhouse, and summer kitchen or washhouse.

It was added to the National Register of Historic Places on June 13, 2008.

References

External links
Jedediah Hawkins Inn

Houses on the National Register of Historic Places in New York (state)
Houses completed in 1864
Houses in Suffolk County, New York
National Register of Historic Places in Suffolk County, New York
Italianate architecture in New York (state)